The 4th "Rubizh" Rapid Reaction Brigade "Hero of Ukraine, Sergeant Serhii Mikhalchuk" is a Brigade of the National Guard of Ukraine established on 2 June 2015. Its training took place in a conformity with NATO standards. The unit structure includes assault battalions, a tank battalion and an artillery squadron, and it receives superior training and equipment. According to Ukrainian Interior Minister Arsen Avakov the creation of the brigade should become the first step towards converting the National Guard into a professional army.

History 

Although the Brigade was established on 2 June 2015, actual recruitment of personnel to the brigade started in October 2015. The unit was trained by foreign military advisers and veterans in conformity with NATO standards, including by Canadian soldiers as part of Operation UNIFIER, most recently in summer 2021.

On 2 June 2016, the formation was presented its colours. According to pro-Russian website Essence of Time, on 19 June 2016 President of Ukraine Petro Poroshenko decided to send the Brigade to Donbas.

The Brigade was reportedly involved in fighting against a Russian Airborne Troops air assault in the Battle for Antonov Airport, located at outskirts Kyiv in Hostomel, on 24 February 2022, during the Russian invasion of Ukraine. The 4th Brigade's fast reaction and counter-attack prevented the airport from being captured by the Russian forces on the first day, and helped to prevent the airport being used to airlift more troops and capture the capital Kyiv. As a result, the Kyiv Offensive turned into a slog fought in the city's northwestern metropolitan areas in Hostomel, Bucha and Irpin.

After the retreat of Russian forces from the Kyiv axis, the 4th Rapid Reaction Brigade was redeployed to the East Ukraine, to fight at the Eastern Ukraine offensive. In the east, unit was involved at the Battle of Severodonetsk, where they fought a month-long defense of the city. And later in the year, the unit was deployed at Bakhmut to fight in the Battle of Bakhmut.

Organization 
The Brigade includes; 
 Brigade HQ and HQ Company
 1st Infantry Battalion
 2nd Infantry Battalion
 3rd "Svoboda" Infantry Battalion
 Tank Battalion
 Field Artillery Battalion
 Anti-aircraft Missile Defense Battalion
 Support Units 

The brigade also includes the units of UAV aircraft, intelligence, communications and logistics. Both soldiers with combat experience and new recruits were accepted to the Brigade.

References 

Brigades of the Ukrainian Ground Forces
Military units and formations established in 2015
2015 establishments in Ukraine
Military units and formations of the 2022 Russian invasion of Ukraine
Military units and formations of the Russo-Ukrainian War